The Scottish Coastal Way is a proposed national long-distance trail that goes around the coastline of mainland Scotland. The idea was first proposed by walkers, and in November 2009 Scottish Natural Heritage (SNH) hosted a conference on the subject. In 2010 SNH estimated that around 2,700 km of coastal paths and routes were existence, compared to a total coastline length of 10,192 km. The existing coastal paths were predominantly in the more populous parts of the country, and few coastal paths exist in more remote areas such as Highlands and Islands. It was recognised that a coastal route, along the lines of the Wales Coast Path, would have many positives, but that development of a fully waymarked route would conflict with conservation aims such as the preservation of the "wild land" qualities of much of the Scottish coast.

The right to responsible access to land allows people to access all of Scotland's coastline, and so there is no bar to a person wishing to walk the length of the coastline. Existing coastal paths are listed below. There is a long-term aspiration to link these routes up to develop a full Scottish Coastal Way by 2030.

Existing coastal paths

Mainland
Listed in anti-clockwise direction, starting at the border with England north of Berwick
Berwickshire Coastal Path
John Muir Way
St Margaret's Way runs 98 km/61 miles from the St Mary's Metropolitan cathedral in the centre of Edinburgh across the Forth Road Bridge to end at the ancient town of St Andrews. 
Fife Coastal Path
Aberdeenshire Coastal Trail
Moray Coast Trail
John o' Groats Trail
North Highland Way
Firth of Clyde Rotary Trail, 259 km / 161 miles long (276km/172miles?), combines three long-distance coastal routes between Mull of Galloway and Milngavie, along the Ayrshire coast and Upper Clyde:
Clyde Coastal Path runs 56 km/35 miles from the Kelly Burn to Greenock, then to Milngavie. It links the Ayrshire Coastal Path and the West Highland Way, and is part of  the International Appalachian Trail (Scotland), which follows the entire western seaboard of Scotland.

Coastal paths on islands
Arran Coastal Way
West Island Way

See also
England Coast Path
Wales Coast Path
North Sea Trail

References

Long-distance footpaths in Scotland
Coastal paths in Scotland